The National Hay Association was formed in the United States in 1895, with membership made up of producers, dealers, brokers and representatives of related industry dedicated to the development and maintenance of quality hay and improved marketing practices. The organization currently has over 500 active members.

Hay-making capitals 
Big Cabin, Oklahoma from 1883 until 1910
Gilbert, Arizona, 1911 until the late 1920s
Yates Center, Kansas
Inola, Oklahoma
Gayville, South Dakota

References

External links
The National Hay Association (NHA) home page

Agricultural marketing organizations
Agricultural organizations based in the United States
Organizations based in Nashville, Tennessee
Agricultural marketing in the United States